Gaetano Rossi (18 May 1774 – 25 January 1855) was an Italian opera librettist for several of the well-known bel canto-era composers including Gioachino Rossini, Gaetano Donizetti, and Saverio Mercadante in Italy and Giacomo Meyerbeer in one of his early Italian successes.  Other composers with whom he worked included Simon Mayr, a composer and Donizetti's teacher, as well as the prolific  Giovanni Pacini.

Biography
Born in Verona, Rossi was writing religious verse by the time that he was 13 years old. He wrote libretti for about 60 years, beginning in 1797 with mostly farsas. Rossi wrote the texts for some significant operas by the well-known composers of the era. These included Tancredi and Semiramide for Rossini and Il crociato in Egitto for Meyerbeer, as well as later operas for Donizetti such as Maria Padilla (as co-author) and Linda di Chamounix. In addition to his writing, he also worked for a time as the stage director for the Teatro Filarmonico in Verona. Musicologist John Black regards him as producing crude versification, "but nevertheless he had an eye for dramatic situations and his texts, if long-winded, were effective." His success was twofold: in finding mostly foreign sources to utilize  as well as introducing "strongly romantic plots to the Italian stage".

Works
Legend: Autumn = Autumn season (Autunno); Carnival = Carnival season (i. e. from 26 December to Easter); Spring = Spring season (Primavera)

References
Notes 

Sources
Black, John (1998), "Gaetano Rossi", in Stanley Sadie (Ed.), The New Grove Dictionary of Opera, Vol. Four, pp. 52–53. London: Macmillan Publishers, Inc.   

1774 births
1855 deaths
Writers from Verona
Italian opera librettists
19th-century Italian writers
18th-century Italian writers
18th-century Italian male writers
19th-century Italian male writers